In Spheres Without Time is the debut album of Norwegian gothic metal band Myriads.

Track listing
 "Fragments of the Hereafter" - 10:20
 "The Day of Wrath" - 7:14
 "Spheres Without Time" - 11:38
 "Seductive Hate" - 8:26
 "Dreams of Reality" - 7:35

Personnel
Mona Undheim Skottene - Lead piano, Keyboard, Vocals 
Rudi Jünger - Drums/Percussion 
Mikael Stokdal - Lead keyboard, Piano, Vocals 
J.P - Guitars 
Alexander Twiss - Guitars, Vocals

Additional musicians
Torp - Bass guitar
Knud Kleppe - Bass guitar

References

In Spheres Without Time @ Encyclopaedia Metallum
Myriads discography @ Myriadds Official Website

1999 debut albums
Myriads albums
Napalm Records albums